In mathematics, the Blumberg theorem states that for any real function  there is a dense subset  of  such that the restriction of  to  is continuous.

Examples

Blumberg spaces

More generally, a Blumberg space is a topological space  for which any function  admits a continuous restriction on a dense subset of  The Blumberg theorem therefore asserts that  (equipped with its usual topology) is a Blumberg space.

If  is a metric space then  is a Blumberg space if and only if it is a Baire space.

Motivation and discussion

The restriction of any continuous function to any subset of its domain (dense or otherwise) is always continuous, so the conclusion of the Blumberg theorem is only interesting for functions that are not continuous. Given a function that is not continuous, it is typically not surprising to discover that its restriction to some subset is once again not continuous, and so only those restrictions that are continuous are (potentially) interesting. 
Such restrictions are not all interesting, however. For example, the restriction of any function (even one as interesting as the Dirichlet function) to any subset on which it is constant will be continuous, although this fact is as uninteresting as constant functions. 

One case that is considerably more interesting is that of a non-continuous function  whose restriction to some dense subset  (of its domain)  continuous. 
An important fact about continuous -valued functions defined on dense subsets is that a continuous extension to all of  if one exists, will be unique (there exist continuous functions defined on dense subsets of  such as  that cannot be continuously extended to all of ). 

Thomae's function, for example, is not continuous (in fact, it is discontinuous at  rational number) although its restriction to the dense subset  of rational numbers is continuous. 
This raises the question: can such a dense subset always be found? The Blumberg theorem answer this question in the affirmative. 
In other words, every function  − no matter how poorly behaved it may be − can be restricted to some dense subset on which it is continuous. 
Said differently, the Blumberg theorem shows that there does not exist a function  that is so poorly behaved (with respect to continuity) that all of its restrictions to all possible dense subsets are discontinuous.

The theorem's conclusion becomes more interesting as the function becomes more pathological or poorly behaved. Imagine, for instance, defining a function  by picking each value  completely at random (so its graph would be appear as infinitely many points scattered randomly about the plane ); no matter how you ended up imagining it, the Blumberg theorem guarantees that even this function has  dense subset on which its restriction is continuous.

See also

Notes

References

 
 
 
 
 https://www.encyclopediaofmath.org/index.php/Blumberg_theorem

Theorems in real analysis
Theorems in topology